General elections were held in Liechtenstein on 7 February 2021 to elect the 25 members of the Landtag. The Patriotic Union (VU) and Progressive Citizens' Party (FBP) both won ten seats, with the VU receiving just 42 votes more than the FBP. The Independents (DU), which finished third in the 2017 elections but then suffered a split in 2018 when three of its five MPs broke away to form Democrats for Liechtenstein (DpL), failed to win a seat, while DpL won two. The Free List retained its three seats, becoming the third-largest party in the Landtag.

Following the elections, the VU and FBP were asked to form a coalition government, ultimately under Daniel Risch (VU). If FBP leader Sabine Monauni had become prime minister following the election, she would have been the first woman to lead the country.

Electoral system
The 25 members of the Landtag are elected by open list proportional representation from two constituencies, Oberland with 15 seats and Unterland with 10 seats. Voters vote for a party list and then may strike through candidates they do not wish to cast a preferential vote for and may add names of candidates from other lists. The electoral threshold to win a seat is 8%.  Landtag members sit four year terms. Once formed the Landtag votes to elect a prime minister who governs through a cabinet of four ministers, who are selected from Landtag members.  Voting is compulsory by law and most is carried out by post.  Polling stations are only open for one and a half hours on election day.  Citizens over 18 years of age who have been resident in the country for one month prior to election day are eligible to vote.

Campaign
The election was seen as a two-horse race. There were only marginal policy differences between the VU and FBP.  In 2017 the FBP won 35.2% of the vote and the VU 33.7%.

Commentators expected the DU, which had received 18.4% of the vote in 2017, to perform poorly in the 2021 election, perhaps failing to meet the electoral threshold. The DpL was expected to achieve better results, perhaps as high as 20%. The Free List party, which was formerly republican, received 12.6% of the vote in 2017.

Election campaigning is largely unregulated and carried out via social media, newspapers and broadcast media.  All parties are permitted to post an official campaign video on the websites of the two main newspapers in the country.  The elections are the first to be carried out under the 2019 Law on Payment of Contributions to Political Parties which limited public funding to registered political parties, banned large anonymous donations and required the publication of accounts by parties.

Candidates
Candidates have the same eligibility criteria as voters.  Political parties must have the support of 30 voters from a constituency to be eligible to nominate a candidate list in it.

Results
The VU and FBP both received 35.9% of the vote.  The result was close between the top two parties with the VU initially reported to have received just 23 votes more than the FBP; in later results, the gap was marginally wider at 42 votes. The FBP result was a slight improvement on their 2017 performance when they received 35.2% of the vote, while the VU increased their vote share from 33.7%. Both the VU and FBP won ten seats, an increase from eight and nine respectively. The FBP and VU will be called upon to form a coalition to govern the country as they had before the election.  With both parties tied on ten seats, it was not clear which party leader would be elected prime minister. The Independents saw their share fall from 18.4% to just 4.2% and failed to win a seat, a reduction of five on their 2017 result. The Free List received 12.9% of the vote, a moderate increase from their 12.7% in 2017, and kept their representation at three seats which made them the third-largest party in the Landtag.  The new party, Democrats for Liechtenstein received 11.1% of the vote and won two seats.

A total of 15,901 ballots were cast, resulting in a 78.0% voter turnout. The vast majority (97.3%) of ballots were cast by post. The results were described by local media as some of the most exciting in recent history.

Candidates elected 
Those in bold elected to the Landstag.  Those in italics elected deputy Landstag members.

References

Liechtenstein
General election
Elections in Liechtenstein
Liechtenstein